Paranandra is a genus of beetles in the family Cerambycidae, containing the following species:

 Paranandra aletretioides Breuning, 1940
 Paranandra andamanensis Breuning, 1940
 Paranandra ceylonica Breuning, 1950
 Paranandra interrupta Breuning, 1948
 Paranandra keyensis Breuning, 1982
 Paranandra laosensis Breuning, 1942
 Paranandra plicicollis Breuning, 1940
 Paranandra strandiella Breuning, 1940
 Paranandra vittula (Schwarzer, 1931)

References

Agapanthiini